Folkesange is the third studio album by Danish band Myrkur, led by singer Amalie Bruun. It was released on 20 March 2020 under Relapse Records. Folkesange diverts from the style of the band's previous black metal albums into folk music. The album consists of renditions of Scandinavian traditional music performed with period instruments such as mandola, lyre, nyckelharpa and talharpa as well as of original acoustic compositions.

The first single from the album, "Ella", was released on 14 January 2020.

Critical reception
Folkesange was met with generally favorable reviews from critics. At Metacritic, which assigns a weighted average rating out of 100 to reviews from mainstream publications, this release received an average score of 75, based on 6 reviews. Metal Hammer named it the 50th best metal album of 2020.

Track listing

Charts

References

2020 albums
Myrkur albums
Relapse Records albums